Killynumber is a townland lying within the civil parish of Kilcronaghan, County Londonderry, Northern Ireland. It lies in the south-east with the civil parish of Desertmartin, and it is bounded by the townlands of Annagh & Moneysterlin, Coolsaragh, Drumsamney, Gortamney, and Killytoney. It was apportioned to the Drapers company as well as freeholds.

The townland was part of Tobermore electoral ward of the former Magherafelt District Council, however in 1901 and 1926 it was part of Iniscarn district electoral division as part of the Draperstown dispensary (registrar's) district of Magherafelt Rural District. It was also part of the historic barony of Loughinsholin.

Etymology
The townland of Killynumber is postulated as being derived from Cúil an Umair meaning "recess of the trough or hollow", with a noticeable hollow lying within the townland.

History

See also
Kilcronaghan
List of townlands in Tobermore
Tobermore

References

Townlands of County Londonderry
Civil parish of Kilcronaghan